The 1997 All-Big 12 Conference football team consists of American football players chosen as All-Big 12 Conference players for the 1997 NCAA Division I-A football season.  The conference recognizes two official All-Big 12 selectors: (1) the Big 12 conference coaches selected separate offensive and defensive units and named first-, second- and third-team players (the "Coaches" team); and (2) a panel of sports writers and broadcasters covering the Big 12 also selected offensive and defensive units and named first- and second-team players (the "Media" team).

Offensive selections

Quarterbacks
 Corby Jones, Missouri (Coaches-1; Media-1)
 Michael Bishop, Kansas State (Coaches-2)
 Scott Frost, Nebraska (Media-2)

Running backs
 Ahman Green, Nebraska (Coaches-1; Media-1)
 Ricky Williams, Texas (Coaches-1; Media-1)
 De'Mond Parker, Oklahoma (Coaches-2; Media-1)
 Brock Olivo, Missouri (Coaches-2; Media-2)
 Darren Davis, Iowa State (Media-2)
 Dante Hall, Texas A&M (Media-2)

Offensive line
 Todd Weiner, Kansas State (Coaches-1; Media-1)
 Mike Morris, Missouri (Coaches-1; Media-1)
 Aaron Taylor, Nebraska (Coaches-1; Media-1)
 Eric Anderson, Nebraska (Coaches-1; Media-1)
 Kendyl Jacox, Kansas State (Coaches-1; Media-2)
 Steve McKinney, Texas A&M (Coaches-2; Media-1)
 Travis Biebel, Missouri (Coaches-2; Media-2)
 Josh Henson, Oklahoma State (Coaches-2; Media-2)
 Jay Pugh, Texas Tech (Coaches-2; Media-2)
 Melvin Thomas, Colorado (Coaches-2; Media-2)

Tight ends
 Alonzo Mayes, Oklahoma State (Coaches-1; Media-1)
 Stephen Alexander, Oklahoma (Coaches-2)
 Derrick Spiller, Texas A&M (Media-2)

Receivers
 Tyrone Watley, Iowa State (Coaches-1; Media-1)
 Phil Savoy, Colorado (Coaches-1; Media-2)
 Donnie Hart, Texas Tech (Coaches-2)
 Ed Williams, Iowa State (Coaches-2)

Defensive selections

Defensive linemen
 Grant Wistrom, Nebraska (Coaches-1; Media-1)
 Montae Reagor, Texas Tech (Coaches-1; Media-1)
 Jason Peter, Nebraska (Coaches-1; Media-1)
 Darren Howard, Kansas State (Coaches-2; Media-2)
 Ryan Olson, Colorado (Coaches-1; Media-2)
 Martin Chase, Oklahoma (Media-2)
 Jamal Williams, Oklahoma State (Coaches-1)
 Marquis Gibson, Missouri (Coaches-2)
 Jerome Evans, Kansas State (Coaches-2)
 Kelly Gregg, Oklahoma (Coaches-2)
 Cody McGuire, Texas Tech (Coaches-2)

Linebackers
 Ron Warner, Kansas (Coaches-1; Media-1)
 Jeff Kelly, Kansas State (Coaches-1; Media-1)
 Dat Nguyen, Texas A&M (Coaches-1; Media-1)
 Mark Simoneau Kansas State (Coaches-2; Media-1)
 Travis Ochs, Kansas State (Media-2)
 Warrick Holdman, Texas A&M (Media-2)
 Jay Foreman, Nebraska (Media-2)
 Hannibal Navies, Colorado (Media-2)
 Kenyatta Wright, Oklahoma State (Coaches-2)

Defensive backs
 Ralph Brown, Nebraska (Coaches-1; Media-1)
 Kevin Williams, Oklahoma State (Coaches-1; Media-1)
 R. W. McQuarters, Oklahoma Stale (Coaches-1; Media-1)
 Hyan Sutter, Colorado (Coaches-2; Media-1)
 Tony Blevins, Kansas (Coaches-2; Media-2)
 Dane Johnson, Texas Tech (Coaches-1; Media-2)
 Harold Piersey, Missouri (Media-2)
 Tony Darden, Texas Tech (Media-2)
 Lamar Chapman, Kansas State (Coaches-2)
 Mike Brown, Nebraska (Coaches-2)

Special teams

Kickers
 Martín Gramática, Kansas State (Coaches-1; Media-1)
 Phil Dawson, Texas (Coaches-2)
 Kyle Bryant, Texas A&M (Media-2)

Punters
 Shane Lechler, Texas A&M (Coaches-1; Media-1)
 Jason Davis, Oklahoma State (Media-2)
 Dean Royal, Kansas (Coaches-2)

Return specialists
 Ben Kelly, Colorado (Coaches-1; Media-1)
 R. W. McQuarters, Oklahoma State (Coaches-1; Media-2)
 Dante Hall, Texas A&M (Coaches-2)
 David Allen, Kansas State (Coaches-2)

Key
Bold = selected as a first-team player by both the coaches and media panel

Coaches = selected by Big 12 Conference coaches

Media = selected by a media panel

See also
1997 College Football All-America Team

References

All-Big 12 Conference
All-Big 12 Conference football teams